"I Was Born with a Broken Heart" is a song co-written and recorded by American country music artist Aaron Tippin. It was released in October 1992 as the third single from the album Read Between the Lines.  The song reached NO. 38 on the Billboard Hot Country Singles & Tracks chart. The song was written by Tippin and Jim McBride.

Before Tippin's version, Josh Logan had recorded the song for his 1988 album Somebody Paints the Wall. David Ball also recorded a version for his 1989 self-titled album.

Chart performance

References

1988 songs
1992 singles
Josh Logan (country singer) songs
David Ball (country singer) songs
Aaron Tippin songs
Songs written by Jim McBride (songwriter)
Songs written by Aaron Tippin
Song recordings produced by Emory Gordy Jr.
RCA Records singles